Ductal papilloma is a group of rare and benign papillary salivary gland tumors arising from the duct system:

 Inverted ductal papilloma
 Sialadenoma papilliferum
 Intraductal papilloma

References

Salivary gland neoplasia